The arrondissement of Arles is an arrondissement of France in the Bouches-du-Rhône department in the Provence-Alpes-Côte d'Azur region. It has 29 communes.

Composition

The communes of the arrondissement of Arles, and their INSEE codes, are:

 Arles (13004)
 Aureille (13006)
 Barbentane (13010)
 Les Baux-de-Provence (13011)
 Boulbon (13017)
 Cabannes (13018)
 Châteaurenard (13027)
 Eygalières (13034)
 Eyragues (13036)
 Fontvieille (13038)
 Graveson (13045)
 Maillane (13052)
 Mas-Blanc-des-Alpilles (13057)
 Maussane-les-Alpilles (13058)
 Mollégès (13064)
 Mouriès (13065)
 Noves (13066)
 Orgon (13067)
 Paradou (13068)
 Plan-d'Orgon (13076)
 Rognonas (13083)
 Saint-Andiol (13089)
 Saintes-Maries-de-la-Mer (13096)
 Saint-Étienne-du-Grès (13094)
 Saint-Martin-de-Crau (13097)
 Saint-Pierre-de-Mézoargues (13061)
 Saint-Rémy-de-Provence (13100)
 Tarascon (13108)
 Verquières (13116)

History

The arrondissement of Tarascon was created in 1800. The subprefecture was moved to Arles in 1817. At the March 2017 reorganization of the arrondissements of Bouches-du-Rhône, it lost six communes to the arrondissement of Aix-en-Provence and one commune to the arrondissement of Istres.

As a result of the reorganisation of the cantons of France which came into effect in 2015, the borders of the cantons are no longer related to the borders of the arrondissements. The cantons of the arrondissement of Aix-en-Provence were, as of January 2015:

 Arles-Est
 Arles-Ouest
 Châteaurenard
 Eyguières
 Orgon
 Port-Saint-Louis-du-Rhône
 Saint-Rémy-de-Provence
 Saintes-Maries-de-la-Mer
 Tarascon

References

Arles